Gregory Steven Stefan (born February 11, 1961, in Brantford, Ontario) is a retired professional ice hockey goaltender in the National Hockey League and currently serves as the goaltending coach for the Flint Firebirds in the Ontario Hockey League.

Biography
As a youth, Stefan played in the 1974 Quebec International Pee-Wee Hockey Tournament with a minor ice hockey team from Brantford which included Wayne Gretzky and Len Hachborn.

Drafted in the 1981 NHL Entry Draft by the Detroit Red Wings, Stefan became known for using his stick to clear skaters in front of the net, many times receiving penalties, and sometimes suspensions.  He is also known for having played Pee Wee level hockey on the same team as Wayne Gretzky.  He played in 299 games, winning 115 of them, before suffering an eventual career-ending knee injury in a game against the Edmonton Oilers.

Stefan began his coaching career in 1993 with the Detroit Jr. Red Wings of the Ontario Hockey League in 1993, and contributed to the team's first OHL championship in 1995.  He remained with the club, which had relocated from Detroit to Plymouth, Michigan, and became the Plymouth Whalers, until 1998, before taking a job with the Carolina Hurricanes of the National Hockey League.  After moving around the Hurricanes system as a scout, and even as an assistant coach, Stefan returned to Plymouth in December 2007 to become the head coach of the club, taking over for Mike Vellucci, who would solely focus on his general manager duties.

The Whalers posted a record of 16–20–3 under Stefan, after starting the season with an 18–8–3 record under Vellucci, however, the team would make the playoffs as the eighth seed in the Western Conference.  In the first round of the post-season, the Whalers were quickly eliminated by the Kitchener Rangers in four games.  Stefan came back to Plymouth for a second season in 2008–09, however, after a start of 6–11–2, he resigned from the position to return to the Carolina Hurricanes organization as a scout. In 2006, Stefan won the Stanley Cup as goalie coach and scout with the Carolina Hurricanes.

Career statistics

Regular season and playoffs

Coaching record

References

External links
 

1961 births
Living people
Adirondack Red Wings players
Canadian ice hockey goaltenders
Carolina Hurricanes coaches
Carolina Hurricanes scouts
Detroit Red Wings draft picks
Detroit Red Wings players
Ice hockey people from Ontario
Oshawa Generals players
Sportspeople from Brantford
Stanley Cup champions
Canadian ice hockey coaches